Lophostigma may refer to:
 Lophostigma (wasp), a genus of wasps in the family Mutillidae
 Lophostigma (plant), a genus of plants in the family Sapindaceae